Prelapse is an album by the Boston-based band of the same name featuring John Zorn. The album was released on the Japanese Avant label in 1999 and features 10 tracks originally written by Zorn for the band Naked City. The band came to Zorn's attention after transcribing several Naked City compositions.

Track listing
 "Menstrual Mystery Meat" (Wendell) - 0:57
 "Alarms" (Johnson) - 3:28
 "Corkscrew" (Zorn) - 0:45
 "Mintcrumb Rosette" (Hudgins) - 3:30
 "Slingshot" (Wendell) - 0:55
 "Blood Sucking Freaks" (Zorn) - 1:26
 "Screwball" (Zorn) - 0:43
 "Cold" (Zorn) - 2:54
 "Message for Alex Part 1" (Lacamoire, Wendell) - 0:52
 "Lachrym" (Lacamoire) - 3:29
 "545: Mystery Hole" (Wendell) - 2:29
 "Leper Sap" (Lacamoire) - 2:32
 "Spectres of Bird" (Zorn) - 1:00
 "Basketcase" (Zorn) - 0:39
 "Fat Neck, No Neck" (Wendell) - 6:14
 "Message for Alex Part 2" (Lacamoire, Wendell) - 0:47
 "Drag" (Johnson) - 3:12
 "Bug Skull" (Zorn) - 0:29
 "The Shrike" (Zorn) - 1:16
 "Pools of Urine" (Wendell) - 2:11
 "Bloodbath" (Zorn) - 0:39
 "Purged Specimen" (Zorn) - 1:30
 "Coda" (Zorn) - 0:16

Recorded at B.C. Studio, New York in November 1997

Personnel
Alex Lacamoire – keyboards
Rev. Mason Wendell – bass, vocals
Dane Johnson – guitar
Andy Sanesi – drums
Jeff Hudgins – alto, clarinet
John Zorn (3, 6, 7, 13, 14, 18, 19, 21-23): alto

References

John Zorn albums
1999 albums
Avant Records albums